Ronald Hewitt (21 June 1928 – 23 September 2001) was a Wales international footballer.

Hewitt was born in Flint, Flintshire. Having failed to break into the first team at Wolves, he had spells with Walsall and Darlington before moving to Wrexham. During his six years there he finished as the top scorer in three of the seasons and established himself as one of the club greats. He was selected to play for the Third Division North representative team in 1956/57. His form there persuaded fellow Welsh side Cardiff City to pay seven thousand pound for his services in 1957. He finished as topscorer in both of his two seasons at the club before returning to Wrexham for another season. He had spells at Coventry City, Chester City and Hereford United before moving into non-league football.

He made his debut for Wales against Israel in 1958 and was part of the Wales squad for the 1958 FIFA World Cup in Sweden.

Hewitt died at the age of 73 in September 2001.

Hewitt was an uncle of Everton coach Andy Holden, who also played for Chester and Wales.

References

1928 births
People from Flint, Flintshire
Sportspeople from Flintshire
Welsh footballers
Wales international footballers
1958 FIFA World Cup players
Walsall F.C. players
Darlington F.C. players
Wrexham A.F.C. players
Cardiff City F.C. players
Chester City F.C. players
Hereford United F.C. players
Congleton Town F.C. players
Coventry City F.C. players
2001 deaths
Association football forwards